Sachin Gupta (born 12 August 1981 in New Delhi) is an Indian music director, composer, guitarist, record producer and a Singer. His work has spanned everything from playing live shows with his previous band 'Mrigya' to composing indie pop albums for artists like Atif Aslam, Alisha Chinoy, Jal, Ahmed Jahanzeb, Apache Indian and Mika among others. Termed by international media as the 'Flying Finger Melodies', his music, as he says, is inspired by real life instances, while his guitar playing has been heavily influenced by Yngwie Malmsteen.

Biography
Sachin Gupta was born in a family of doctors and has studied science at school level. He was in Frank Anthony and spent a couple of years in Apeejay School in New Delhi. Having gotten through IIT-Delhi in Mechanical Engineering, Sachin decided to instead study physics (honours) and went to Sri Venkateswara College in Delhi University. But after a year, he moved to study B.Com (Hons) at Shahid Bhagat Singh College while pursuing music simultaneously. He was introduced to the guitar at the age of 7 by his mother and ever since, he took music as his calling in life.
He has performed at over 600 concerts across various countries including Dubai, London, Singapore, New Zealand and Australia that has included major music festivals such as the Jazz Fest, Edinburgh Fest and Scotland Fest. He met with the Vice-President of TIPS Films in London during one of his shows, and he moved to Mumbai in 2005. A progression into Bollywood came naturally to him.

He married Sasha Agha, the daughter of Salma Agha. However, the relationship did not run smoothly.

Career

Indie pop
Sachin has made a variety of songs under various genres. His rock tones in his compositions for Atif Aslam's Doorie brought him fame in dismal indie music scene. He has composed and produced tracks on Mika's album Dunali, Ashok Masti's Clap on the Beat and Alisha Chinnoy's Shut Up N Kiss Me. He also produced tracks for Apache Indian and UK based Khiza. Other names include Pakistani artists Jal, Adeel and Ahmed Jahanzeb. Presently Sachin is working on two Indian bands, Rooh and Ni9NE.

Film career
Sachin ventured into Bollywood with the two promotional tracks called Yaad Aaye Woh Din and Farishta for the Jimmy Shergill-KK Menon starrer Strangers released in 2007. His first full-fledged film is Dil Kabaddi that stars Irrfan Khan, Soha Ali Khan, Rahul Bose, Konkona Sen Sharma and Rahul Khanna.

He was featured in Prince, a TIPS film with Kumar Taurani that has Viveik Oberoi in the lead. His second film was Manoj Bajpai starrer Jugaad. His music for the movie Jo Hum Chahein had lyrics by Kumaar, his next film album is for Yash Raj Films youth film division Y-Films production Mere Dad Ki Maruti where he teams up with lyricist Kumaar again.

Filmography

As A Music Director

As a Singer

References

1981 births
People from New Delhi
Indie pop musicians
Indian guitarists
Indian film score composers
Living people
Indian record producers
Indian male singer-songwriters
Indian singer-songwriters
Indian male pop singers
Apeejay School alumni
Delhi University alumni
Singers from Delhi
21st-century guitarists
Indian male film score composers
21st-century Indian male singers
21st-century Indian singers